Provincial Road 330 (PR 330) is a provincial road in the south-central part of the Canadian province of Manitoba. It is a heavily used route linking the city of Winnipeg with the bedroom community of La Salle and an alternate to Provincial Trunk Highway 75 (PTH 75), the main highway between Winnipeg and the town of Morris.

Route description
PR 330 begins at the Perimeter Highway (PTH 100) in the Rural Municipality of Macdonald and heads south, passing through the communities of La Salle and Domain before ending at PTH 75 north of Morris. The entire route is a two-lane, paved highway.

References

External links
Official Manitoba Highway Map

330